Gerry Williams may refer to:

Gerry Williams (artist) (1926–2014), American ceramist and magazine co-founder and publisher
Gerry Williams (footballer) (1877–1901), Australian rules footballer for St Kilda
Gerry Williams, see List of Tales of the Unexpected episodes

See also
Jerry Williams (disambiguation)
Gerard Williams (disambiguation)
Jeremy Williams (disambiguation)
Jerome Williams (disambiguation)